Altunin or Altunina (feminine, Алту́нина) is a Russian surname. Notable people with the surname include:

 Alexander Altunin (1921–1989), Soviet general and politician

Russian-language surnames